Claude Titre (30 December 1930 – 29 January 1985) was a French actor. Titre is best known for portraying fictional character  Bob Morane in the 1965 TV series.

Filmography

References

External links

1930 births
1985 deaths
People from Rabat
French male film actors
French male stage actors
French male television actors
20th-century French male actors